Robert Minhinnick (born 12 August 1952) is a Welsh poet, essayist, novelist and translator. He has won two Forward Prizes for Best Individual Poem and has received the Wales Book of the Year award a record three times (in 1993, 2006 and 2018).

Biography
Minhinnick was born in Neath, and now lives in Porthcawl. He studied at University of Wales, Aberystwyth, and University of Wales, Cardiff. An environmental campaigner, he co-founded the charities Friends of the Earth (Cymru) and Sustainable Wales. His work deals with both Welsh and international themes.

He has published seven poetry collections and several volumes of essays. He edited the magazine, Poetry Wales from 1997 until 2008. He has also translated poems from contemporary Welsh poets for an anthology, The Adulterer's Tongue. His first novel, Sea Holly, was published in autumn 2007.

Awards
Minhinnick won the Forward Prize for Best Individual Poem in 1999 for 'Twenty-five Laments for Iraq', and again in 2003 for 'The Fox in the National Museum of Wales'. His poem ‘The Castaway’ was also shortlisted in 2004. He has also won an Eric Gregory Award (1980) and a Cholmondeley Award (1998), both awarded by the Society of Authors to British poets.

Minhinnick has won the English-language Wales Book of the Year award a record three times: in 1993 for his essay collection Watching the fire-eater, in 2006 for his essay collection To Babel and Back and in 2018 for his poetry collection Diary of the Last Man. His win with Diary of the Last Man in 2018 also meant that Minhinnick had received the award in each of the three decades of its existence.

Works

Poetry
The Yellow Palm (1998)
A Thread in the Maze (1978) C. Davies
Native Ground Triskele, 1979, 
Life Sentences Poetry Wales Press, 1983, 
The Dinosaur Park Poetry Wales, 1985, 
The Looters Seren, 1989, 
Hey Fatman Seren, 1994, 
Selected Poems Carcanet, 1999, 
After the Hurricane Carcanet, 2002
King Driftwood Carcanet Press, 2008, 
After the Stealth Bomber
New Selected Poems, Carcanet, 2012, 
Diary of the Last Man, Carcanet, 2017

Novels
Sea Holly Seren, 2007, 
The Keys of Babylon (2011) Seren Press
Limestone Man Seren Books, 2015,

Essays
Watching the fire-eater Seren Books, 1992, 
The Green Agenda: Essays on The Environment of Wales (ed.) (1994) Seren Press
Badlands (Seren, 1996, 
To Babel and Back (2005)

Translation
The Adulterer's Tongue: Six Welsh Poets: A Facing-Text Anthology (ed., transl.) (2003)

References

External links

1952 births
Living people
Anglo-Welsh poets
Alumni of Aberystwyth University
Alumni of Cardiff University
Welsh environmentalists
People from Neath
People educated at Ysgol Brynteg
Anglo-Welsh novelists
Welsh male poets
21st-century Welsh poets
21st-century British male writers
21st-century Welsh writers